Katherine Faith Macky  (25 June 1921 – 10 December 2006), also known as Willow Macky, was a New Zealand songwriter. She frequently collaborated with Dorothea Franchi.

In the 2006 New Year Honours, Macky was awarded the Queens Service Medal for community service. She died on the 10th of December 2006.

References

1921 births
2006 deaths
New Zealand songwriters
People educated at St Cuthbert's College, Auckland
Recipients of the Queen's Service Medal